The Canadian province of Saskatchewan held municipal elections on November 9, 2020. Elections in Saskatoon, Swift Current and Maple Creek were delayed or deferred due to a snowstorm.

Listed below are selected municipal mayoral and city councillor races across the province. An "(X)" is listed next to the incumbent's name (if there is one).

Balgonie

Rural Municipality of Corman Park No. 344

Estevan

Humboldt

Lloydminster

Martensville

Meadow Lake

Melfort

Moose Jaw

By-election
A by-election was held November 3, 2021 to replace Tolmie, who was elected to parliament in the 2021 Canadian federal election.

North Battleford

Pilot Butte

Mayor

Council

Prince Albert

Mayor

Regina

Mayor

Regina City Council

Saskatoon 
Due to a massive snowstorm, the Saskatoon election was extended to November 13.

Mayor

Saskatoon City Council

Swift Current
Due to a massive snowstorm, the election was postponed until November 12.

Warman

Weyburn

Yorkton

References 

Municipal elections in Saskatchewan
Saskatchewan, municipal
Municipal elections
Saskatchewan municipal elections